Hilde M. Palland (born 13 September 1979), also known as Hilde Palland-Mulder, is a Dutch politician serving as a member of the House of Representatives since 2019. A member of the Christian Democratic Appeal (CDA), she was previously elected to the municipal council of Kampen from 2006 to 2018, where she chaired the party group from 2009 onwards. Palland became a parliamentarian upon the resignation of former party leader Sybrand van Haersma Buma. She studied law at the University of Groningen.

References

1979 births
Living people
21st-century Dutch women politicians
21st-century Dutch politicians
Christian Democratic Appeal politicians
Municipal councillors in Overijssel
People from Kampen, Overijssel
Members of the House of Representatives (Netherlands)
Protestant Church Christians from the Netherlands
University of Groningen alumni
20th-century Dutch women